Lee Gilbert is a British Author, Speaker, Marketing Consultant based in Peterborough.

Career
Gilbert worked from 1995 to 2000 for Pearl Assurance in Peterborough in notable roles in Human Resources and IT. During her time at Pearl she qualified as in HR as a CIPD and acquired multiple Sales Training and Management Training certifications and awards.

In 2001, she formed her own company acting as a Digital Marketing Consultant and Speaker under which she worked as an interim consultant in multiple organisations and startups and been a regular speaker at Business conferences in UK, Europe and the Middle East.

Books
Lee Gilbert has been credited with two published books, namely:
Turning Monkeys Into Lemons
The Secrets of the Serious Players' Webmaster

References

1977 births
Living people
British businesspeople